Oechydrus is a genus of Neotropical butterflies in the family Hesperiidae (Eudaminae).

Species
There are two species recognised in the genus Oechydrus:
 Oechydrus chersis  (Herrich-Schäffer, 1869)
O. c. chersis (Herrich-Schäffer, 1869) - Bolivia
O. c. ochrilinea (Schaus, 1902) - Peru
O. c. rufus Evans, 1953 - Brazil (Rio de Janeiro)
 Oechydrus evelinda (Butler, 1870) - Brazil (Rio de Janeiro)

References

External links
Images representing Oechydrus chersis at Consortium for the Barcode of Life
Natural History Museum Lepidoptera genus database

Hesperiidae
Monotypic butterfly genera
Taxa named by Edward Yerbury Watson
Hesperiidae genera